Michael O'Flaherty is the name of:

Michael O'Flaherty (politician) (1891-1959), former mayor of Galway
Michael O'Flaherty, Irish human rights lawyer, academic and United Nations official

See also
Michael Flaherty (disambiguation)